John Cadman (1772 – 12 November 1848) worked as a publican in England, before becoming a convict and being transported to Australia.

Outline of life

On 11 March 1797, Cadman was sentenced to transportation for life at the Worcester assizes, after being arrested at Bewdley on the charge of stealing a horse. Cadman was transported aboard Barwell, which left Portsmouth on 7 November 1797 and reached Sydney on 18 May 1798.

In 1809, Cadman became the coxswain of a government boat. While in the service of the Government as a coxswain, he lost an eye. Cadman received a conditional pardon from Governor Lachlan Macquarie in 1814 and a free pardon in 1821. Cadman became the master of the cutter Mars in 1825, which took 25 prisoners to Newcastle. He was then promoted to the position of Superintendent of Government Boats at Sydney in 1827 on a salary of £91, until he retired in 1845. When that position of office was abolished in 1845, Governor Sir George Gipps recommended "his great respectability" and arranged for him to be paid a retiring gratuity of £182.

Since 1816 Cadman had occupied a rough stone cottage at The Rocks. Cadmans Cottage still stands today and is the oldest surviving house within the city of Sydney. On 5 or 6 January 1818, Cadman received government permission to marry at Sydney. On 26 October 1830 John married Elizabeth Mortimer.

Cadman died on 12 November 1848 and was survived by Elizabeth Mortimer and her two daughters from a previous alliance. Cadman was buried in the old Devonshire Street Cemetery (now Central railway station, Sydney's main terminus); his headstone and remains were taken to Bunnerong Cemetery (now Eastern Suburbs Memorial Park) in 1901. Cadman's headstone still remains there and the inscription reads:

Three cruise vessels on Sydney Harbour were named after Cadman; the 1974 built John Cadman, the 1986 built John Cadman II and the 1989 built John Cadman III.

References

External links 

 Colonial Secretary's papers 1822-1877, State Library of Queensland- includes digitised documents and letters written by Cadman to the Colonial Secretary of New South Wales when he was employed as Superintendent of the Government Boats

1772 births
1848 deaths
Convicts transported to Australia
History of New South Wales
British publicans
Burials at Eastern Suburbs Memorial Park